K. Avukader Kutty Naha (1920–1988) was an Indian politician and social worker who served as the Minister of Local Administration in various Kerala Governments from 1968 to 1979. As an Indian Union Muslim League minister in the 1967–69 Namboodiripad ministry, Naha oversaw the creation of the Malappuram District in central Kerala (1969). Naha, with minister M. N. Govindan Nair and official C. K. Kochukoshy, also devised the 'One Lakh Houses' scheme in Kerala (1970–77 Achutha Menon ministry). 

Naha was later appointed the Deputy Chief Minister of Kerala (1983–87) under United Democratic Front Chief Minister K. Karunakaran. He was the Indian Union Muslim League representative to the Kerala Legislative Assembly from Tirurangadi Assembly Constituency (1957–87).

Naha was born in February 1920 to Kunhikoyamutty Haji. He was married to P. K. Kunhibeebi Umma. He is the father of the former Kerala state Education Minister P. K. Abdu Rabb (2011–16).

Career 
 Member, Malabar District Board (1954)
 Chairman, House Committee (1960–62)
 Deputy Leader, Muslim League Legislature Party (1980–82).
 Committee on Public Undertakings  (1982–83).
 Vice President, Indian Union Muslim League Kerala State Committee
 President, Kerala State Swathanthra Thozhilali Union.

Member of Legislative Assembly

Minister in different Kerala ministries

References

Further reading
 Kerala Legislative Assembly 
 Indian Union Muslim League
  Kerala Legislative Assembly

1920 births
1988 deaths
Indian Union Muslim League politicians
Deputy chief ministers of Kerala
Kerala MLAs 1957–1959
Kerala MLAs 1960–1964
Kerala MLAs 1980–1982